William Henley may refer to:

 William Cumming Henley (1860–1919), British artist, naturalist and botanist, and scientific microscopist
 William Ernest Henley (1849–1903), British poet, critic and author
 William Thomas Henley (1814–1882), British telegraph engineer and pioneer submarine cable manufacturer
 William Henley (violinist) (1882–1957), English violinist and composer